Pão de queijo ("cheese bread" in Portuguese) or Brazilian cheese bread is a small, baked cheese roll or cheese bun, a popular snack and breakfast food in Brazil. It is a traditional Brazilian recipe, originating in the state of Minas Gerais.

Pão de queijo originated in Brazil. Enslaved people would soak and peel the cassava root and make bread rolls from it. At this time, there was no cheese in the rolls. At the end of the 19th century, more ingredients became available to the colonial community such as milk and cheese. They added milk and cheese to the tapioca roll making what we now know as pão de queijo. It is inexpensive, often sold from streetside stands by vendors carrying a heat-preserving container. In Brazil, it is also very commonly found in groceries, supermarkets and bakeries, industrialized or freshly made. It is also widely eaten in northern Argentina.

Despite being referred to as "bread", the cheese bread is basically a type of starch tart cookie or sweet plus eggs, salt, vegetable oil, and cheese, with soft and elastic consistency and with a few variations.

History 
With the discovery of mines near Ouro Preto in around 1700, some 20% of the Brazilian population at that time, mainly slaves, occupied a vast territory in southeast Brazil. Since wheat was not available, local cooks created a kind of bread from starch derived from the cassava tuber shown to them by Tupiniquins indigenous groups. In the late 19th century, grated hard cheese was added.

Main ingredients

There are several different recipes of Brazilian cheese bread where the ingredients and the type of cheese vary widely – as well as the final result. Some of them use sweet starch, other sour, or even both. But what gives it its main feature is that it is based on cassava starch and some kind of cheese.

The fat – lard, vegetable oil, butter or margarine – acts as a molecular lubricant,
 contributing to the elastic texture of the dough.

The egg gives colour and flavour to the recipe.

The type of cheese varies according to preference or availability. The most used are mozzarella, parmesan, and (more traditionally) Minas cheese (either in its "ripened" or "standard" version).  The cheese gives the typical flavor of the cheese bread, hence its name.

There is also the boiled cheese bread with a preparation technique that requires boiling water while preparing, sometimes mixed with vegetable oil in flour. The boiled cheese bread has the closest taste of natural, as in the boiling process the dough is pre-cooked.

Some recipes use potato.

Preparation
Pães de queijo are formed into small balls, around 3–5 centimeters in diameter (though they may be larger) and about 50 calories in each roll. The cassava flour is a powerful starch which is key to the texture of the pão de queijo; unlike other types of bread, pão de queijo is not leavened. Small pockets of air within the dough expand during baking and are contained by the elasticity of the starch paste. Because it is made of cassava flour (as opposed to wheat flour), pão de queijo contains no gluten. Varieties of stuffed pães de queijo with catupiry, hot and melted goiabada, doce de leite and other variations can be found in Brazil.

Availability

Brazil

In Brazil, pão de queijo is a popular breakfast dish and snack. It continues to be widely sold at snack bars and bakeries, and it can also be bought frozen to bake at home. In Brazil, cheese puff mix packages are easily found in most supermarkets.

Wider South America 
Often referred to as cuñapés, chipá, pandebono, pan de yuca or pan de queso in Hispanic America, cassava flour x cheese balls very similar to pão de queijo can be found in northern Argentina, Paraguay, Bolivia, Ecuador, and Colombia.

United States
Given its growing popularity in the US, the frozen packages of pão de queijo can now be found in some American grocery stores such as Costco, Sam's Club, Ralph's, County Market, HEB, Market Basket, Publix, World Market, Whole Foods, and Trader Joe's.

Japan / East Asia
Pão de queijo arrived in Japan with the dekasegi. It is usually made with rice flour instead of the cassava (tapioca) starch.

Australia
Pão de queijo is available in Australia in specialty international food stores and some major supermarkets, including Woolworths and Coles as of early 2023, under the Cheesebuddy brand. It is marketed as a "naturally gluten-free" snack.

See also

Pan de queso (from Colombia)
Cheese bun (includes list of those popular in South America)
 Gougère (from France)
 Chipa (from Paraguay)

References

Brazilian cuisine
Buns
Cheese dishes
Portuguese words and phrases
Cassava dishes
Culture in Minas Gerais